Gion Caviezel was a Swiss bobsledder who competed in the late 1960s and early 1970s. He won a bronze medal in the two-man event at the 1970 FIBT World Championships in St. Moritz.

References
Bobsleigh two-man world championship medalists since 1931

Possibly living people
Swiss male bobsledders
Year of birth missing (living people)
20th-century Swiss people